This is a list of former sports teams from the US state of Georgia:

Baseball

Major Leagues

Negro league baseball
Atlanta Black Crackers (1920–1938)

Minor Leagues

Georgia–Florida League
Albany Cardinals (1947–1958)
Americus Phillies (1947–1950), Americus Rebels (1951)
Americus-Cordele Orioles (1954–1955)
Brunswick Pirates (1951–1956)
Cordele A's (1950–1953)
Cordele Indians (1947–1949)
Dublin Orioles (1958)
Fitzgerald A's (1956)
Fitzgerald Orioles (1957)
Fitzgerald Pioneers (1953), Fitzgerald Redlegs (1954)
Moultrie A's (1948–1949)
Moultrie Cubs (1950)
Moultrie Giants (1952)
Moultrie Packers (1947)
Moultrie Reds (1955–1956)
Moultrie To-baks (1951)
Moultrie/Brunswick Phillies (1957–1958)
Thomasville Dodgers (1953–1958)
Thomasville Tigers (1947–1950)
Thomasville Tomcats (1952)
Tifton Blue Sox (1951–1953) (1955)
Tifton Indians (1954)
Tifton Phillies (1956)
Valdosta Dodgers (1946–1952), Valdosta Browns (1953), Valdosta Tigers (1954–1958)
Valdosta Trojans (1939–1942)
Waycross Bears, (1947–1955), Waycross Braves (1956–1958),

South Coast League
Macon Music (2007)
South Georgia Peanuts (2007)

Southern League
Atlanta Crackers (1884-1965)
Savannah White Sox (1962), became Lynchburg White Sox (1963–1965), Evansville White Sox (1966–1968), Columbus White Sox (1969), Columbus Astros (1970–1988), Columbus Mudcats (1989–1990), the Carolina Mudcats (1991–2011)
Columbus Confederate Yankees (1964–1966)
Macon Peaches
Savannah Braves
Savannah Indians
Savannah Senators

Western Carolinas League / South Atlantic League
Albany Polecats (1992–1995)
Augusta Pirates
Augusta Tourists
Columbus Indians (1991), later became the Columbus RedStixx (1992–2002), moved to Eastlake, Ohio
Macon Braves became the Rome Braves in 2003
Macon Peaches
Macon Pirates
Macon Redbirds
Savannah Cardinals (1984–1995), became the Savannah Sand Gnats in 1996
Savannah Sand Gnats (1996-2015), moved to Columbia, South Carolina to become the Columbia Fireflies
South Georgia Waves, based in Albany, GA in 2002 and Columbus, GA in 2003, became Columbus Catfish (2004-2008), moved to Bowling Green, Kentucky and now play as the Bowling Green Hot Rods.

Basketball

Men's

Global Basketball Association
Albany Sharp Shooters (1991–1992)
SouthGA Blues (1991–1992)

Women's

American Basketball League
Atlanta Glory (1996–1998)

Football

Atlantic Coast Football League
 Atlanta Spartans (1964)

Arena Football
 Georgia Force (2002–2008 (League folded), 2011–2012 (Team folded))

Hockey

Major leagues

National Hockey League (NHL)
Atlanta Flames (1972–1980) – relocated to Calgary, Alberta, now Calgary Flames
Atlanta Thrashers (1999–2011) – relocated to Winnipeg, Manitoba, now Winnipeg Jets

Minor leagues

Atlantic Coast Hockey League
Macon Trax (2002–2003) Moved to WHA2 for 2003–04

Central Hockey League
Columbus Cottonmouths (1996–2001) Obtained a franchise in the East Coast Hockey League
Macon Whoopee (1996–2001)

East Coast Hockey League/ECHL
Augusta Lynx (1998–2008) Folded midseason
Columbus Cottonmouths (2001–2004) Cottonmouths' organization joined the Southern Professional Hockey League and the ECHL franchise moved to Bradenton–Sarasota, Florida, to play as Gulf Coast Swords, franchise revoked in summer 2006 after construction halted on proposed home arena
Macon Whoopee (2001–2002) moved to Lexington, Kentucky, as Lexington Men O' War, now Utah Grizzlies

International Hockey League
Atlanta Knights (1992–1996) Became the Quebec Rafales (1996–1998)

Southern Hockey League
Macon Whoopees (1973–1974)

Southern Professional Hockey League
Augusta RiverHawks (2010–2013) Arena's ice system failed and the team became the Macon Mayhem in 2015
Columbus Cottonmouths (2004–2017)
Macon Trax (2004–2005)

Soccer

North American Soccer League
Atlanta Chiefs (1967–1972), became the Atlanta Apollos in 1973, revived the Chief's name in 1979, then folded in 1981
Atlanta Silverbacks (1998 as the Atlanta Ruckus-2016), A-League, USISL, USL and finally NASL

United Soccer Leagues
Atlanta Magic/Atlanta Datagraphic Magic/Atlanta Lasers (Indoor: 1991–1992) (Outdoor: 1993–1996)
Atlanta Express (Indoor: 1990/91) (Outdoor: 1991)
Georgia Steamers (1990–1991), became the Atlanta Quicksilver then  was renamed the Atlanta Lightning

Women's United Soccer Association
Atlanta Beat (2000–2003)

See also
List of defunct Florida sports teams
List of defunct Mississippi sports teams
List of defunct Ohio sports teams
List of defunct Pennsylvania sports teams

Georgia
Defunct sports teams in Georgia (U.S. state)
Defunct teams